Donnchad Clereach Ó Maol Braonáin, Irish cleric and musician, died 1343. 

The Annals of Lough Ce, sub anno 1343, note the manner of Ó Maol Braonáin's death:

Donnchadh Clerech O'Maelbhrenainn, a canon chorister at Oilfinn (Elphin), was killed with a shot of an arrow by the people of Hubert, son of David Donn Mac William (Burke).

His surname is generally now rendered as Brennan.

References

 Music in Prehistoric and Medieval Ireland, Ann Buckley, pp. 744–813, in A New History of Ireland, volume one, Oxford, 2005

External links
 http://www.ucc.ie/celt/published/T100010A/index.html
 http://www.irishtimes.com/ancestor/surname/index.cfm?fuseaction=Go.&UserID=

Medieval Gaels from Ireland
Irish murder victims
14th-century Irish Roman Catholic priests
Musicians from County Roscommon
Irish-language singers